Santhamaguluru is a village in Bapatla district of the Indian state of Andhra Pradesh. It is located in Santhamaguluru mandal in Chirala revenue division.

References 

Villages in Prakasam district
Mandal headquarters in Prakasam district